Libellula herculea is a species of Libellula found in  Argentina, Bolivia, Brazil, Belize, Colombia, Costa Rica, Ecuador, French Guiana, Guatemala, Guyana, Honduras, Mexico, Nicaragua, Panama, Peru, Paraguay, El Salvador, and Venezuela

References

External links

Libellulidae